Dongcha railway station is a railway station on the Baoji–Lanzhou high-speed railway in Maiji District, Tianshui, Gansu. The station opened on 6 May 2019.

It is located 22 minutes along the line from Tianshui South railway station and 20 km by road from Dongcha town. Its location on a tall viaduct near Jinlongshan Scenic Area has led it to be nicknamed the 'most beautiful high speed rail station in China'.

References 

Railway stations in Gansu
Stations on the Xuzhou–Lanzhou High-Speed Railway
Railway stations in China opened in 2019